The following is a list of characters from the manga series Bungo Stray Dogs.

Creation and design
The characters of Bungo Stray Dogs were created by Kafka Asagiri and designed by Sango Harukawa. Asagiri noted that in the making of the story, the character designs were developed first rather than their plot lines since the restrictions of the plot might cause the characters to become too flat. The manga originated from Asagiri's idea to gather multiple famous late authors and draw them as young adults and teenagers with supernatural powers, and in his hope that more people would find an interest in literature with the series.

Armed Detective Agency

Atsushi Nakajima

Named after Atsushi Nakajima. A 18-year-old man who used to live at an orphanage before the caretakers threw him out. Their words condemning him as "worthless" have since left trauma on him and drive his will to fight in order to find a reason to live, slowly gaining confidence as the series progresses. His ability is named , which allows him to turn into a large white tiger with incredible strength, speed, regenerative capabilities and durability, although he has no control over it and retains no memory if he fully transforms (this lack of control is however repressed when he joins the Agency and the ability of the Agency's president causes Atsushi to regain control over the tiger). Later, he learns to change his limbs to that of a tiger to enhance his physical abilities. Despite his lack of confidence, he has a pure heart and fights hard to protect others.

Osamu Dazai

 Named after Osamu Dazai. A member of the Armed Detective Agency who takes Atsushi under his wing and is known as a "suicide maniac" due to his constant suicide attempts and contemplations of a peaceful death, preferably with a beautiful woman. Under his carefree and relaxed demeanor, however, Dazai is extremely cunning, intelligent, skilled and brutal, and a feared former executive of Port Mafia. His ability, lets him completely nullify any supernatural ability by touch.

Doppo Kunikida

Named after Doppo Kunikida. Dazai's partner, known for his meticulous planning, organisation and perfectionistic tendencies; due to this, he is easily riled by Dazai's pranks. He has a habit of writing and planning everything ahead in his signature notebook, with the front cover labelled "Ideals". This notebook is linked to his ability, which allows him to bring into existence any object he writes inside, as long as it isn't larger than the notebook itself.

Ranpo Edogawa

Named after Edogawa Ranpo. The only Agency member without an ability and a self-proclaimed detective. Although he is one of the oldest in the office, he lacks basic everyday skills, preferring to focus his intelligence on solving cases instead. His prodigious observational and deduction skills are nicknamed  by him, which are supposedly activated when he puts on his glasses.

Junichirō Tanizaki

 Named after Jun'ichirō Tanizaki. An 18-year-old assistant at the Agency who mainly focuses on gathering information as his ability, allows him to project illusions within a certain area, which is not extremely suited for combat. He cohabits with his younger sister Naomi and treasures her dearly, despite finding some of her antics annoying.

Kenji Miyazawa

 Named after Kenji Miyazawa. A 14-year-old optimistic and carefree boy hailing from the countryside, he is extremely popular among Yokohama residents due to his honesty and cheerful attitude. This makes him the Agency's primary data collector from eyewitnesses. His ability is called , which grants him superhuman strength when he's hungry.

Akiko Yosano

 Named after Yosano Akiko. She is the medic of the Agency feared for her torturous treatments. While her ability  allows her to heal any wound, as long as the patient is on the verge of death; this results in her often injuring her patients thoroughly before healing them.

Yukichi Fukuzawa

 Named after Fukuzawa Yukichi. He is the President of the Armed Detective Agency, as well as Kunikida's mentor. This ability is especially useful for those who lack control over their abilities like Atsushi and Kyōka.

Kyōka Izumi

Named after Kyōka Izumi. A 14-year-old orphan girl who was taken in by the Port Mafia and became their youngest assassin. Her ability, materializes Demon Snow, a ruthless sword-wielding phantom that only follows orders coming from her mobile phone, which allowed Akutagawa to control her ability in the past. Her parents used to be assassins as well until an enemy attempted to use a body manipulation ability on them. Kyōka's mother, who at that time owned Demon Snow, killed her husband and subsequently herself as she was gradually succumbing to the ability, her last words ordering the phantom to protect her daughter and passing on this ability. However, this technique was incomplete, resulting in Demon Snow only listening to orders from the phone.

Kirako Haruno

 A clerk working at the Armed Detective Agency.

Naomi Tanizaki

Junichirō's sister and a high school student who has a brother complex and frequently likes to tease him. Although she can be tiresome to her brother at times, she is a capable young woman. She only works part time at the agency since she's only a teenager.

Katai Tayama

Named after Katai Tayama. He is an information broker for the Agency with the ability Futon, which allows him to control electronics within his sight as long as he is not touching them.

Port Mafia

Ryūnosuke Akutagawa

Named after Ryūnosuke Akutagawa. A 20-year-old member of the Port Mafia. His ability is called , consisting of a black coat that turns into a black beast which can tear anything apart, even space. A former apprentice of Dazai, he is very disdainful of his new subordinate Atsushi.

Chūya Nakahara

Named after Chūya Nakahara. He is an executive member of the Port Mafia and Dazai's former partner as Double Black (双黒 Soukoku). His ability is called , which allows him to manipulate the gravity vector of objects with which he is in physical contact. He's rather short and dislikes being reminded of it, especially by Dazai. Although rather hot-headed and ruthless, he is not impossible to reason with, and knows the importance of compromise and rationality.

Ichiyo Higuchi

Named after Ichiyo Higuchi, she is a member of the Port Mafia and a subordinate of Akutagawa, who she greatly admires. Although the nature of her ability is yet to be confirmed, she is shown to be physically capable and possesses formidable fighting skills.

Motojirō Kajī

 Named after Motojirō Kajii. A 28-year-old member of the Port Mafia, and an infamous bomber.

Hirotsu Ryūrō

 Named after Ryūrō Hirotsu. A sharply dressed man, he is a commander of the Black Lizard, the mafia's squad of hitmen. His Ability, sends objects flying with a powerful force. He's diligent in his work and dislikes unprofessional behavior.

Michizō Tachihara

Named after Michizō Tachihara. A cold commander of Black Lizard never seen without his dual guns. Later on, he is revealed to be the fifth member of the Hunting Dogs, a special ability group tasked by the government to catch dangerous gifted. He has the ability ) which grants him ferrokinesis, the ability to manipulate metal, and allows him to remotely control metal objects with great proficiency. He has been described by Teruko as "born to be a spy."

Gin Akutagawa

A very silent and stealthy commander of the Black Lizard group. Initially assumed male, Dazai reveals she's actually Ryūnosuke Akutagawa's younger sister. She can be cold, fearsome, and dangerous as her brother. Despite not having an ability, she fights fiercely with her knife as an assassin.

Ōgai Mori

Named after Mori Ōgai. The leader of Port Mafia. Despite being a mafia boss, he acts like a gentleman, being polite to allies and enemies alike. As a former doctor, he can be very dangerous in a fight, and is ruthlessly pragmatic and mathematical in his reasoning, frequently quoting logicians and statisticians. His Ability, allows him to configure Elise's actions and mood, enabling her to act as a distraction or to protect him with superhuman feats such as flight or extreme speed. Mori is also Fukuzawa's former partner.

Elise

Named after the character in The Dancing Girl, Elise is a young girl with blonde hair under the care of Ougai Mori, who she calls "Rintaro" for an unknown reason. As a manifestation of Mori's ability, her existence as a human is unclear, though she considers the mafia to be her family.

Kōyō Ozaki

Named after Ozaki Kōyō. She is a Port Mafia executive with the ability , capable of conjuring a sword-wielding spirit like Kyouka's and commanding it at will. She cares deeply for Kyōka and wants her to have the happiness that she never got. When she was 19, Mori assigned her to be Chūya's caretaker. Although she holds herself with great dignity and grace, she does not hide her dark nature.

Sakunosuke Oda

 Named after Sakunosuke Oda. A low-ranking member of Port Mafia and a friend of Dazai and Ango. His ability, allows Oda to predict the future for 5-6 seconds. His name is often shortened as 'Odasaku'. He wanted to eventually retire from the mafia and be a writer, but the terrorist André Gide killed the orphans under his care, provoking him into a fight to the death. His last words motivated Dazai to leave the mafia and join the Agency, to pursue work that saves lives instead of ending them.

Kyūsaku Yumeno
 

 Named after Yumeno Kyūsaku. They are also known as "Q". Their ability  is a mind control curse. If someone has harmed them, either intentionally or unintentionally, they will fall under the curse when Yumeno splits open the doll they always carry with them. The curse itself makes people see illusions that turn them hostile, usually forcing them to attack friends and foes recklessly. After an incident where they used their curse on members of the Port Mafia, they were considered too dangerous and imprisoned by Dazai and Chūya.

Ace
 

Named after Alan Bennett (his name and ability name were changed to avoid copyright issues). Also known as "A", he was a Port Mafia executive who captured Fyodor Dostoyevsky. His ability, The Madness of the Jewel King (based on The Madness of George III), allowed him to turn his subordinates' lives into jewels (provided they wore a collar Ace gave them), their worth depending on the target's lifespan. He was outwitted into committing suicide by Fyodor, after planning to betray the Port Mafia.

Karma
 

A young member of the Port Mafia and Ace's subordinate, killed by Fyodor in his escape.

Paul Verlaine

Named after Paul Verlaine. He infiltrates the upper floor of the Port Mafia headquarters to steal the files on Chuuya and take Rimbaud's hat. Later, he clarifies that he intends to take Chuuya with him, referring to him as "younger brother".

The Guild

Francis Scott Key Fitzgerald

Named after F. Scott Fitzgerald & Francis Scott Key, he is the Leader of the "Fellowship of The Guild". His ability is called 'The Great Fitzgerald' (based on The Great Gatsby), which grants him an increase in strength at the expense of his money. Simply throwing currency off a balcony, for example, can trigger his power. His goal is eventually revealed to be the retrieval of "The Book", to revive his dead daughter. After his defeat to Akutagawa and Atsushi, he rebuilds his organization from the ground up.

Lucy Maud Montgomery

 Named after Lucy Maud Montgomery. A member of The Guild and Fitzgerald's subordinate. An orphan who suffered trauma from her caretakers like Atsushi, although she never recovered like he did. This resulted in Lucy developing a psychotic personality, while also developing a dependency on the guild as she believes no one else is willing to accept her. Her ability is 'Anne of Abyssal Red' which allows her to create an alternate reality known as "Anne's Room", in which people are imprisoned if they get caught by a giant doll named Anne while playing tag. When the Guild collapses, she gets a job in the cafe below the agency, and eventually becomes their ally.

Margaret Mitchell

 
 Named after Margaret Mitchell. A member of the Guild, partnered with Nathaniel Hawthorne. Margaret's temperament can only be described as arrogant, prone to looking down on anyone around her be they friend or foe. Her ability is called "Gone with the Wind", which allows her to literally weather away any object caught in the wind. She is visually portrayed as an American Southern belle.

Nathaniel Hawthorne

 Named after Nathaniel Hawthorne. A member of the guild, and partner to Margaret Mitchell. A man of God who always carries a Bible with him, Nathaniel believes that it is his duty to punish the sinners of the world. As a result, he often comes off as arrogant when he "judges" people and is prone to getting into quarrels with Margaret. Nathaniel's ability is called The Scarlet Letter, which allows him to convert his own blood into holy words, with offensive and defensive applications. He makes a deal with Fyodor after the fall of the Guild, and serves him in a disturbed cognitive state.

John Steinbeck

 
 Named after John Steinbeck. A member of the Guild, and partner to H.P. Lovecraft. Steinbeck hails from a large family of farmers from North America, and joined the Guild in an effort to support them financially. Steinbeck's relaxed and friendly personality hides a fierce sadistic streak. His ability, The Grapes of Wrath, allows him to sprout grapevines from his neck which he can graft to other plants. Any plant with a grafted grape branch can be freely controlled by Steinbeck as a part of his own body. He actually despises Fitzgerald, seeing his view on people and money as disgusting and cruel. After the Guild collapses, he becomes the leader of the Guild remnants, and resolves to crush Fitzgerald's new ventures.

Howard Phillips Lovecraft

 Named after H. P. Lovecraft. A member of the guild and partner to John Steinbeck. A bizarre man in his late twenties, Lovecraft is prone to be distracted by the most unusual things such as wood grains. While never outright stated in the series, Lovecraft hints that his ability, "The Great Old Ones", is not an actual ability as Dazai is unable to nullify it. When fully activated, The Great Old Ones turns Lovecraft into a powerful tentacled monster that can only be damaged from the inside. After the defeat of Fitzgerald, Lovecraft claims his contract has become null, and bizarrely walks into the ocean, claiming to be "going to sleep".

Mark Twain

Named after Mark Twain. A member of the guild and his ability is "Huckleberry Finn & Tom Sawyer", an ability that takes the forms of the dolls known as (voiced by Risae Matsuda (Japanese), Abby Trott (English)) and (voiced by Satsumi Matsuda (Japanese), Colleen O'Shaughnessey (English)). He serves as sniper and thanks to Huck and Tom his aim is excellent.

Louisa May Alcott

 Named after Louisa May Alcott. A member of The Guild whose ability, "Little Women", allows her to slow time down when she is thinking in a private room. Her shy demeanor makes her work as a strategist. She has never used her ability for herself and is completely devoted to Fitzgerald.

Herman Melville

Named after Herman Melville. An elder member of The Guild whose ability is "Moby-Dick", which takes the form of a gigantic white whale-themed airship. Herman used to be the Guild leader in the past.

Edgar Allan Poe

 Named after Edgar Allan Poe. A member of The Guild with the ability Black Cat in the Rue Morgue. Poe can transport readers into the setting of any novel that they are currently reading. He also has a pet raccoon named Karl. He views Ranpo as a rival.

Rats in the House of the Dead

Fyodor Dostoyevsky

 Named after Fyodor Dostoevsky. He is the head of the Rats in the House of the Dead. His ability, "Crime and Punishment", has yet to be described, but is shown to be able to cause instant death on touch. He is also a member of the "Decay of Angels" group, under Kamui's leadership.

Alexander Pushkin

Named after Alexander Pushkin. He is a member of the Rats in the House of the Dead. His ability is "A Feast in Time of Plague". This ability allows Pushkin to infect two given people with a special virus. The two infectees are guaranteed to die, unless one of them is killed, which will end the other's illness.

Ivan Goncharov

Named after Ivan Goncharov. He is a member of the Rats in the House of the Dead. His ability is "The Precipice", which grants him control over geological constructs.

Mushitaro Oguri

 (Japanese), Mick Lauer (English) 
Named after Mushitaro Oguri. He is a member of the Rats in the House of the Dead. His ability is "Perfect Crime", which erases all evidence of a given crime.

Decay of Angels
The Decay of Angels is a terrorist organization of five people, devoted to the destruction of all nations.

Nikolai Gogol

Named after Nikolai Gogol, is a member of the Decay of the Angels. Despite showing a sadistic personality, Nikolai often hints he suffers when hurting other people. His ability is The Overcoat.

Sigma

Sigma is a member of Decay of  Angels who runs a casino on an airship. While his ability has yet to be named, it is an information transfer ability that allows anybody in physical contact with Sigma to gain the information they most want to know in exchange for him learning what he most wants to know from them. Fyodor notes that Sigma's potential comes from the fact that he is a 'desperate man' who will do anything to protect the 'home' he finds in the casino. Atsushi believes that Sigma possesses a page of the supernatural Book that the Decay of Angels used to frame the Detective Agency for a murder case.

Bram Stoker
 
Named after Bram Stoker, in the past, Bram was an earl in Northern Europe. Despite formerly being a human, his cells had been mutated due to an ability, which then resulted in him being transformed into a blood-sucking species and he became known as Dracula. Bram's ability name is currently unknown. However, it is an infection-type ability which turns whoever he bites into a vampire. It also makes the victim the next aggressor.

Hunting Dogs
The  is a military organization working for the government. Its members include Ōchi Fukuchi, Teruko Ōkura, Saigiku Jōno, Tetchō Suehiro and Michizō Tachihara. When the Decay of Angels use the supernatural Book to frame the Agency, the Hunting Dogs go to execute them.

Ōchi Fukuchi

Named after Fukuchi Ōchi, he is the commander of the Hunting Dogs special units and has the ability Mirror Lion. However, in reality, he is the leader of the terrorist organization, the Decay of Angels, acting under the alias of Kamui.

Saigiku Jōno

Named after Saigiku Jōno, he is a member of the Hunting Dogs special unit and has the ability Priceless Tears.

Teruko Ōkura

Teruko Ōkura is the vice-commander of the Hunting Dogs special unit who has the ability Gasp of the Soul.

Tetchō Suehiro

Named after Tetchō Suehiro. He is a member of the Hunting Dogs special unit. His ability is Plum Blossoms in Snow.

Other characters

Ango Sakaguchi

Named after Ango Sakaguchi. A government worker whose ability is "Discourse on Decadence". Ango once worked as Port Mafia's Intelligence Agent, but it was under the Government's orders to spy the mafia's activities. During his time working as an intelligence agent under for the Port Mafia, he also became an agent for Mimic under Mori Ougai's orders.

Santōka Taneda

Named after Santōka Taneda. He is the director of the Special Ability Department. Not much is known about his past, though it's hinted that he helped on the creation of the Armed Detective Agency and was also the one who helped Osamu Dazai to find a job in the Agency after he left the Port Mafia. His ability is called Hail in the Begging Bowl.

André Gide

Named after André Gide. He was the leader of a criminal organization from Europe known as Mimic. Like Sakunosuke, his ability, "Strait is the Gate", allows him to see a few seconds into the future. A former soldier betrayed by his country, he wanted to have a glorious death and killed Oda's loved ones to drive him to despair. After a lengthy duel, they mutually killed each other.

Aya Kōda

Named after Aya Kōda. She is a civilian who assisted Kunikida with a case, a spirited girl who calls herself a warrior of justice and practices martial arts every day. Aya is stubborn, refusing to take no for an answer, and makes fun of Kunikida often.

Shōsaku Katsura

 Named after the main character of Doppo Kunikida's work "An Uncommon Common Man."

Agatha Christie

Named after Agatha Christie. Her ability is And Then There Were None.

Mizuki Tsujimura

Named after Mizuki Tsujimura, she is an agent of the Special Division for Unusual Powers and is assigned to Ayatsuji Yukito. Tsujimura's ability, Yesterday's Shadow Tag, allows her to create 'baby shadows'. It also takes the appearance of a grim reaper with a scythe when it activates automatically. Just like Kyōka, her mother transferred her ability to her, and she does not have complete control over it. It will activate immediately when she wants to kill someone, and the reaper shadow will execute them before she can attack, making Tsujimura unable to kill anyone herself.

Tatsuhiko Shibusawa

 Named after Tatsuhiko Shibusawa. An original character created for the movie Dead Apple.

Arthur Rimbaud

Named after Arthur Rimbaud. He was an executive of the Port Mafia with an extreme aversion to cold. First known under the alias of 'Randou', it's later revealed to be a European spy, trying to find a god-like entity, Arahabaki, from within a military facility with his partner, Paul Verlaine. Following Paul's betrayal, he was forced to try and use Arahabaki to fight the military, but the failed attempt resulted in a massive explosion that destroyed the facility and Rimbaud's memories. His alias was taken from an incorrect pronunciation of his name that was written on his hat. His ability, "Illuminations", allows him to create a hyperspace under his control to the point which he can event disregard the rules of physics, rendering Chuya's powers useless and even withstanding Dazai's nullification to a limited degree.

Natsume Sōseki

Named after Natsume Sōseki. He is the former mentor of Yukichi Fukuzawa and Ōgai Mori. He is first briefly featured in the light novel Dark Era, and appears during the Cannibalism Arc to interrupt the fight between the Agency and Port Mafia. His ability is "I Am a Cat".

Ayatsuji Yukito

Named after Yukito Ayatsuji. A detective and one of the main characters in the Gaiden novel. He is currently one of the top-ranked people on the Japanese government's list of dangerous ability users. His ability is Another which allows him to see through the criminal in a murder case. Once the criminal behind a murder is identified, the killer will face certain death through an "accident."

Herbert George Wells

Named after Herbert George Wells is a character featured in the light novel Bungo Stray Dogs: 55 Minutes. Wells's ability, Time Machine allows her to manipulate time itself. She can send an individual back in time with the use of her camera, but this is limited to 55 minutes or 3300 seconds. Also, she is only able to transport someone to the past once. Originally, Wells is only able to transport a person to the past limited to several minutes, but after being utilized by "Gab" for countless of times, it was extended to 55 minutes.

Jules Gabriel Verne

Named after Jules Gabriel Verne is a character featured in the light novel, 55 Minutes. He is one of the inhabitants of Standard Island, as the island itself is the form of his ability. Verne's ability, The Mysterious Island allows him to absorb the abilities from any ability-user who dies on Standard Island.

Nobuko Sasaki

Named after Nobuko Sasaki, Doppo Kunikida's first wife, she is a lecturer at a university in Tokyo. She is the Azure Apostle and former accomplice to the Azure King, her lover, and attempts to ruin the Armed Detective Agency after her lover's death.

Reception
The characters of Bungo Stray Dogs have been popular in Japan with Crunchyroll noting that most of them appeared in a Newtype poll when the anime premiered in 2016. Manga.Tokyo enjoyed Osamu Dazai due to his appealing interactions with Doppo Kunikida while also enjoying Mamoru Miyano's performance as his voice actor. Atsushi's characterization has earned mixed responses The Fandom Post noted that his power of becoming a tiger gave him potential to make goods rather than the curse he fears. On the other hand, Reel Run Down considered Atsushi as one of the weakest characters due to his constant insecure thoughts despite having multiple achievements in the storyline. Otaku USA noted that while Atsushi becomes a hero during the story, he is overshadowed by others character he found more interesting. Nevertheless, Atsushi's and Akutagawa's rivalry has also resulted into positive reaction due to how each character balance the other in terms of personality and how they become allies for a short for one of the most entertaining fights in the series. Anime News Network still enjoyed the new bond he formed with former Guild member Lucy Maud Montgomery; the reviewer noted Lucy became attracted to him and thus expected a form romance or love triangle would be composed between these two characters as well as Kyoka as this character also formed a strong bond with Atsushi. Concluding this comment, the reviewer expected this would happen the story would be benefitted from this type of subplot since Bungo Stray Dogs barely handled romance.

References

Bungo Stray Dogs